Gilia flavocincta, the lesser yellowthroat gilia, is a plant in the phlox family (Polemoniaceae) found in the Arizona Uplands of the Sonoran Desert. The plants grow in extensive patches of pink-lavender flowers that fill the air with a sweet honey scent.

References

flavocincta
Flora of Arizona
Flora of the Sonoran Deserts